Events in the year 1920 in India.

Incumbents
 Emperor of India – George V
 Viceroy of India – Frederic Thesiger, 1st Viscount Chelmsford

Events
 National income - 30,428 million
 1 September - Non-cooperation movement was launched by Mahatma Gandhi.
 8 September – The Jamiat Ulama-e-Hind issued a religious edict, Fatwa Tark-e-Mawālat on the boycott of British goods.
 14 September - Muhammadan Anglo-Oriental College, founded by Sir Syed Ahmed Khan in Aligarh in 1875, becomes Aligarh Muslim University.
 October - Formation of All India Trade Union Congress.
 25 November - Founding of the University of Lucknow.

Law
 8 July – The House of Commons adopts the findings of the Hunter report.
Provincial Insolvency Act
Passport (Entry Into India) Act
Identification of Prisoners Act
Aligarh Muslim University Act
Charitable and Religious Trusts Act
Indian Red Cross Society Act

Births

January to June
12 February – Pran, actor (died 2013).
16 February – I. S. Johar, actor, writer, producer and director (died 1984).
7 April – Ravi Shankar, sitar player and composer (died 2012).
14 June - Acharya Shri Mahapragya 10th Acharya of Jain Terapanth Sect (died 2010)

July to December
14 July – Shankarrao Chavan, politician and twice Chief Minister of Maharashtra (died 2004).
1 August – Annabhau Sathe, social reformer and writer (died 1969).
19 October – Pandurang Shastri Athavale, philosopher, spiritual leader, social reformer, who founded the Swadhyay Movement (died 2003).
27 October – K. R. Narayanan, politician and 10th President of India (died 2005).
17 November – Gemini Ganesan, actor (died 2005).

Full date unknown
Bharat Bhushan, actor (died 1992).

Deaths
26 April – Srinivasa Ramanujan, mathematician (born 1887).
1 August – Bal Gangadhar Tilak, nationalist, social reformer and independence fighter (born 1856).
30 November – Mahmud Hasan Deobandi, freedom fighter, co-founder of the Jamia Millia Islamia and founder of the Silk Letter Movement (born 1851)

References

 
India
Years of the 20th century in India